"What She Don't Know Won't Hurt Her" is a song written by David Lindsey and Ernie Rowell, and recorded by American country music artist Gene Watson.  It was released in November 1982 as the second single from the album This Dream's on Me.  The song reached #5 on the Billboard Hot Country Singles & Tracks chart.

Chart performance

References

1983 singles
Gene Watson songs
MCA Records singles
1982 songs